Hayley Dowd (born September 7, 1994) is an American professional soccer player who plays as a striker for Djurgården of the Swedish Damallsvenskan. She previously played for the Boston Breakers in the National Women's Soccer League (NWSL).

Early life and education
Raised in Peabody Massachusetts, Dowd attended Peabody High School from 2009–2012. , she remains the school's all-time leading scorer. Boston Herald called her "one of the most prolific scorers in state history." She finished her high school career with 148 goals and 56 assists (204 points).  A four time Herald All-Scholastic honoree, she led the varsity soccer team to a state championship win in 2011 and was named Gatorade Player of the Year.

Club career 
Dowd played for Morön BK for the 2019 and 2020 seasons. During the 2019 season, she scored 33 goals and won the league's Golden Boot award for most goals scored. During the 2020 Elitettan season, she scored 15 goals.

Dowd signed with Djurgårdens IF in Sweden's top league, the Damallsvenskan, for the 2021 season.

References

External links 
 
 
 Boston College profile
 
 

1994 births
Living people
Women's association football forwards
Boston Breakers players
Djurgårdens IF Fotboll (women) players
Damallsvenskan players
American women's soccer players
Boston Breakers draft picks
Boston College Eagles women's soccer players
National Women's Soccer League players